Cookie Run (Hangul: 쿠키런; RR: Kukileon, stylized in CamelCase) is a series of online mobile endless running games developed by Devsisters. Inspired by the classic folk tale The Gingerbread Man, the series is set in a world of conscious gingerbread cookies that were brought to life in an oven by a witch and have since escaped her evil clutches. Each game has a mechanic of the cookies running to earn points and items, overcome obstacles, and fight or escape enemies.  The series is available on iOS and Android devices.

Gameplay
Cookie Run is a series of online mobile running games that involve battling to reach the end of a level, with the most recent, non spin-off game being Cookie Run: OvenBreak, which features an ever-expanding collection of cookies, support pets, and valuable treasures, all bearing a different number of points depending on the combination used. Cookie Run at the moment includes six modes, with other modes that will come and go for events. Each game is based on the "freemium" model, which offers the basic game for free while encouraging users to pay in smaller doses for virtual in-game items or abilities.

Main series

OvenBreak
OvenBreak released 15 June 2009. Since its release, it updated to OvenBreak 2 on 11 December 2012, but on 11 December 2013, it was announced that the game would be delisted from the Appstore. A separate title, OvenBreak Infinity, also released in September 2009. In late 2010, OvenBreak Infinity reached #1 on the iOS App Store in the United States in the "Top Free Apps" category.

In Summer 2012, Skittles integrated its brand within OvenBreak as part of a sponsorship program through a new play mode, which featured Skittles in the gameplay and its home screen.

Cookie Run (LINE and Kakao)

Cookie Run released originally for KakaoTalk on 2 April 2013. It was Devsisters' first game under the Cookie Run IP. It later released for LINE on 29 January 2014 and the game has since seen over 114 million downloads.

On 5 June 2018, the LINE version of Cookie Run shut down and was removed from the Google Play Store and the App Store.

Cookie Run: OvenBreak

Cookie Run: OvenBreak released globally (with the exception of China) on 27 October 2016. The game was originally titled 'Cookie Run 2' when Devsisters revealed their development of a sequel to Cookie Run in April 2015, which was planned to be launched globally by the second half of the year. On 27 September 2016, the game was released for soft-launch, now under the current name, in Canada, Australia, Hong Kong, the Philippines, the Netherlands, and Sweden on both Apple App Store and Google Play.

In late-November 2018, Cookie Run: OvenBreak and Devsisters collaborated with Sanrio for a Hello Kitty event from 29 November to 19 December.

 Story Mode, where players will run through stages and collect some pieces of the story to read about GingerBrave and his friends' main adventure. You can earn from 1-3 stars for each Run and order them to count on the Chapter's Rewards which are crystals. After players reach three stars in a specific stage, they can get better ingredients from Pouches such as ingredients to level up their Magic Candies and ingredients to craft some items in Laboratory.
 Trophy Race is an online multiplayer mode where ten global players compete for the highest score to earn trophies. Trophies are used to unlock new lands up to Champion's League. The Champion's League is a mode where the most skilled players run in 3 arenas to earn ranks at the end of a season. By running in the Champion's League, players earn Medals, exchanged for items, cookies, costumes, pets, or treasures. The Champion's League also includes the Hall of Fame, where players pay tribute to the highest-ranking players globally for free rewards such as crystals, rescue tickets, or coins.
Breakout is the primary mode of Cookie Run, where 3 to 15 cookies run to escape the oven. Every relay adds more points to the combined score, which determines a player's rank for a certain period. Each class will earn more crystals and legendary cookies if players reach Diamond or Rainbow Ranking at the end of the running period.
 Although it is the same as the "Breakout" from the cookies, pets, treasures, as well skins are all assigned randomly, and buffs are included, so it is the ranking only with luck. The idea was taken from the “Random Breakout" which was frequently done by Cookie run YouTubers and rankers.
 In the Cookie Trials, players form teams from available collected cookies collected and try to earn points to move up the ranks, going from Bronze to Diamond. Rewards are given for climbing ranks. When a new cookie comes out with a Cookie Trial, players will receive a New Cookie Cup, which provides players with extra rewards for each level earned, such as more crystals or chests to be used in the game's gacha to unlock new cookies, pets, or treasures.
 In the Island of Memories, cookies run through the memories of Hero Cookie (a spoof of Iron Man), Cheerleader Cookie, and of both Dr. Wasabi and Mustard Cookie, with new types of boss fights for each Island. Every level played awards stars based on completing specific objectives, which unlock items such as costumes, crystals, coins, and other islands and cookies.
 Cookie Runs Guild Run is a mode where guilds, or interactive groups of global players, can run, cook recipes (for boosting), and explore different regions together. Guild Runs are split into competitive seasons, where four Guilds run against each other in foreign lands bearing additional bonuses each. The rank in Guild Run determines a guild's position, which rewards players more or less depending on their participation, and the class itself. The game has additional modes such as Friendly Run or Custom Run added for brief periods as events.
 Cookie Run: OvenBreak introduced a new gamemode where players will collaborate with each other to take down a raid boss. This gamemode involves using various skills players can unlock by having certain cookies. The gameplay of the gamemode itself consists of collecting skill orbs to charge up their skills to attack and damage the raid boss. depending on how quickly the players defeated the raid boss they will earn a rank from the amount of points they earned the best being SSS+. Depending on the rank players will earn chests that take a certain amount of time to open or can be sped up using an avocado key. These chest can provide various items some of which are used to upgrade skills to kill the boss quicker.

Cookie Run: Kingdom

Cookie Run: Kingdom was released on 19 January 2021 worldwide and had its official English release on 8 October 2021., Unlike the previous games, Cookie Run: Kingdom takes place in an alternate universe and is a mix of a collectible RPG and a social kingdom-building game. It features new Cookies and over 200 levels. The game tells the story of the cookies getting used to their new lives in their new Kingdom, after escaping from the witch. She brought them to life and has an overarching narrative of the cookies set out on an expedition to rediscover the lost Ancient Kingdoms, before Dark Enchantress Cookie possesses them.

Cookie Run: Kingdom collaborated with KFC for the Cookie Run: Kingdom x KFC pack until 8 February 2021. Later in September 2021, the game had a collaboration with Sega with a Sonic the Hedgehog crossover event until 16 October 2021. In October 2021, the game experienced a sudden boost in popularity due to viral videos on TikTok, as well as former Genshin Impact players ditching the game, due to the latter's controversial handling of its first anniversary celebration. On July 28, 2022, it collaborated with Disney for a crossover featuring Mickey Mouse, his friends, and some of the Disney princesses.

 World Exploration is the PVE contents of Cookie run Kingdom. It shows the stories of numerous cookies, focusing on the main story The main story includes voice actor dubbing. 
 It is PVP content that is actually in charge of the game’s main content. It gives combat that doesn’t control cookies. It will be held on a seasonal basis and compensation will be given according to the tier. 
 It is a very difficult mode because the final goal is to go on a boss raid “Red Velvet Dragon”, “Avatar of Destiny” and “Living Abyss”  with the guild members and it requires various strategies as the stage goes up.

Cookie Run: OvenSmash
Cookie Run: OvenSmash is an upcoming game. Early concepts of the game were revealed by Devsisters, featuring some of the OvenBreak characters. It is the first game to be rendered entirely in 3D graphics.

Spin-off titles

Cookie Wars
Cookie Wars is a spin-off game based around the plot of the previous Cookie Run games. It is a mobile strategy game that was in closed beta, with around 10,000 users testing the game from 10 to 16 April.

On 26 July 2018, the game was soft launched in three countries, Thailand, Hong Kong and Canada. It released globally on 23 August 2018.
On 15 April 2020, Devsisters announced that Cookie Wars would shut the game down in the following month.

Cookie Run: Puzzle World
Cookie Run: Puzzle World (formerly named Cookie Run: JellyPop and Hello! Brave Cookies) is a match-three puzzle game by Devsisters. The game was soft-launched in May 2019 and introduced to international users first to get feedback. It was later officially released in January 2020 worldwide.

Cookie Run: Puzzle World underwent several name changes since its beta release. The current name was adopted on 26 July 2020.

Reception
The Cookie Run series as a whole has received success domestically and internationally. The original OvenBreak was downloaded over 10 million times and was ranked as the most popular free app on the App Store in 20 countries by 2012. Cookie Run for LINE has ranked #1 in Thailand and #4 in Taiwan for sales in 2014, while seeing over 2.9 million daily users on Kakao in Korea in 2013. Cookie Run: OvenBreak made it in Apple's Best of 2017 for the top 10 most-downloaded free iPhone and iPad games. The game was also in the top 20 free iPhone games in 2017 in South East Asia. Cookie Run: Kingdom was the Grand Prize winner of the 2021 Korea Game Awards with the Best Game of the Year Award and the Character Award of the Year. In Google Play's Best of 2021 for Korea, it was chosen as a winner for Best Game of the Year and User's Choice of 2021. In Korea and Thailand, it won Best Competitive; and in Hong Kong and Taiwan, Best Game Changers. In 2022, Cookie Run: Kingdom won the Pocket Gamer People's Choice award.

See also
 List of Cookie Run characters

References

External links
Devsisters' site (Korean)
The Cookie Run: OvenBreak site
The Cookie Wars site
The Cookie Run: Kingdom site
The Cookie Run: Puzzle World site

Video game franchises
Video games about food and drink
Cookies in popular culture